King George V Memorial Park may refer to:

 King George V Memorial Park, Hong Kong
 King George V Memorial Park, Kowloon